"The Dream Never Dies" is a song written by Richard Cooper. It was first recorded by American country singer-songwriter Bill Anderson. It was released as a single in 1979 via MCA Records and became a top 40 hit single.

Background and release
"The Dream Never Dies" was recorded in August 1977 in Nashville, Tennessee. The session was produced by Buddy Killen, who recently became Anderson's producer after many years of working with Owen Bradley. Killen would continue producing Anderson until his departure from MCA Records. It was the only song recorded during this particular studio session.

"The Dream Never Dies" was released as a single by MCA Records in July 1979. The song spent nine weeks on the Billboard Hot Country Singles before reaching number 40 in August of 1979. It was among Anderson's final top 40 singles of his career. It was also his second single to not become a major hit since 1975. In Canada, the single only reached number 42 on the RPM Country Songs chart in 1978.

Track listings
7" vinyl single
 "The Dream Never Dies" – 4:25
 "One More Sexy Lady" – 2:44

Chart performance

References

1979 singles
1979 songs
Bill Anderson (singer) songs
MCA Records singles
Song recordings produced by Buddy Killen